Mattias Granlund (born June 14, 1992) is a Swedish professional ice hockey player currently contracted to Almtuna IS of the HockeyAllsvenskan (Allsv).

He played with Skellefteå AIK in the Elitserien during the 2010–11 Elitserien season. Granlund later moved down a division to play with Swedish team IK Oskarshamn in Hockeyallsvenskan.

References

External links

1992 births
Almtuna IS players
IF Björklöven players
IK Oskarshamn players
Karlskrona HK players
Living people
People from Skellefteå Municipality
Skellefteå AIK players
Swedish ice hockey left wingers
Sportspeople from Västerbotten County